The Lion and the Unicorn is an academic journal founded in 1977. It examines children's literature from a scholarly perspective covering the publishing industry, regional authors, comparative studies, illustration, popular culture, and other topics. It provides unique author and editor interviews and a highly regarded book review section. The journal frequently takes the form of special themed issues.

The journal is published three times each year in January, April, and September by the Johns Hopkins University Press. Circulation is 686 and the average length of an issue is 160 pages. The title of the journal was inspired from a scene in the 1871 book Through the Looking-Glass.

See also 
 Children's literature periodicals
 Children's literature criticism

External links 
 
 The Lion and the Unicorn at Project MUSE

Literary magazines published in the United States
Book review magazines
Children's literature criticism
English-language magazines
Johns Hopkins University Press academic journals
Magazines established in 1977
Magazines published in Baltimore
Triannual magazines published in the United States